Our Lady's Secondary School may refer to:

Our Lady of Fatima Secondary School, Aligarh, India
Our Lady of Mount Carmel Secondary School, Mississauga, Ontario
Our Lady's Secondary School, Templemore, County Tipperary, Ireland

See also
Our Lady's High School (disambiguation)